Mark or Marc Yates may refer to:

Mark Yates (footballer) (born 1970), English football manager and former player
Mark Yates (born 1968), guitarist for Terrorvision
Marc Yates, Jersey sport shooter at the 2010 Commonwealth Games

See also
Mark Yeates (disambiguation)